Gordon Wills (24 April 1934 – 10 January 2018) was a professional footballer who played for Wolves, Notts County, Leicester City and Walsall as an attacking midfielder. He played in the Cup Winners Cup for Leicester City.

Club career

Wolverhampton Wanderers

Notts County

Leicester City

Walsall

Career statistics

Personal life

References

1934 births
2018 deaths
English Football League players
Leicester City F.C. players
English footballers
English Football League representative players
Walsall F.C. players
Wolverhampton Wanderers F.C. players
Notts County F.C. players
Association football forwards
Sportspeople from Wednesbury